FilKONtario is a fan-run convention in the Greater Toronto Area, Ontario area dedicated to filk, the music of science fiction and fantasy fandom.  Established in 1991, it is the only filk convention in Canada.  In its fifth year (1995), the convention initiated the Filk Hall of Fame, which continues to recognize those who have made significant contributions to filk music and the filk community, worldwide.  This international awards program is administered through FilKONtario, with an international jury.

History
At the time FilKONtario was founded, there were only five filk conventions worldwide: Consonance (San Francisco area), ConChord (Los Angeles area, started 1983), the Northeast Filk Con, and Ohio Valley Filk Fest (Columbus area, started in 1984), and the British Filk Con (started in 1989).  Heather Borean, the first conchair, wanted something a little closer to home and proposed the idea of founding a new con.  The name is a concatenation of "Filk", "KON" (for "convention") and "Ontario."  The early days of FilKONtario were a bit challenging.   Attendance was low the first few years, but a feeling of relaxed inclusiveness, following the lead of the con's first year guests, Bill and Brenda Sutton, became the norm.  In 1994, the convention drew a large crowd, with guest Kathy Mar, and has been quietly growing since that time.

In the first year the convention mascot was established, which is a penguin with a guitar.

Like most filk conventions, other than the Ohio Valley Filk Fest, FilKONtario is a small event, usually with about 130-150 attendees.  Gradually the convention has grown from modest beginnings to offer programming Friday evening through Sunday afternoon, with requisite filk circles until the early morning, workshops in the mornings and a "Dead Penguin" (a play on "dead dog") sing Sunday evening.  In addition, the guest roster has grown from a single guest of honour, to having a GoH, a Filk Waif, an Interfilk Guest and an occasional Special Guest, an author or artist from Southern Ontario.  "Filk Waif" is an idiosyncratic term honoring the first waif, Mary Ellen Wessels, whom two of the concom members brought to the con at their expense because she couldn't afford it.  (Hence, "waif".) The role is identical to Toastmaster.

In 2007, in cooperation with  Interfilk and after two years of fundraising, FilKONtario's only guest was the n'Early Music Consort, a choir of sixteen performers from England.  This is thought to be one of the largest guest slates offered at a small convention.

FilKONtario has been the honoured recipient of guests funded by  Interfilk since 1994.  Interfilk is an international arts charity registered as a 501(c)3 in California.  FilKONtario is one of the recognized cons on that charity site.

Typical convention activities
Programming typically includes: Concerts, song-writing contests, workshops on guitar, voice, performance, etc., one-shots, dealers' room, a fund-raising auction for Interfilk, theme circles, and, especially, open song circles where everyone who chooses can sing and play, and listeners are especially welcome. The circles start in the late evening and go into the early hours of the morning, or later. There is an opening reception, and sometimes a CD release. Some children's programming is usually available.

Recording of the concerts and filks has been done since the first year of FilKONtario, resulting in the following releases, the first two on tape, the remainder on CD:
 Make Believe (FilKONtario 1), Wail Songs
 Let's Have a Filksing (FilKONtario 2), Wail Songs
 Songs From FilKONtario 7: Why Can't Penguins Filk?, Love Song Productions, A Dozen Cats Studios (Savedsounds and USB Studios) 
 Where the Magic is Real (FilKONtario 8), a joint production of FilKONtario and USB Studios
 Filk Dreams — music from FilKONtario 9, USB Studios
 Filk Memories — music from FilKONtario 10, USB Studios
 FilkNotes — the music from FilKONtario 11, USB Studios
 Filk Together — music from FilKONtario 12, USB Studios
 Triskaidekafilkia — music from FilKONtario 13, USB Studios

Filk Hall of Fame
Inductions into the Filk Hall of Fame take place at the Saturday evening banquet. The Hall was created to honour "contributions to filk music and the filk community".  Each year a jury reviews the nominations and votes anonymously for their selections.  Once the votes are tallied, the Administrator contacts the inductees for the current year.  The citations noting the inductees' contributions are read at the banquet, and those inductees present are given a copy of the citation and a plaque.  These items are mailed to those not present.

The next day there is a concert in honour of the new Hall of Fame inductees.  Each new inductee selects five pieces of music significant to him, her or them.  These are performed at the concert.

There is additional extensive material about how to nominate and what constitutes contributions to the filk community on the Filk Hall of Fame web site.  In addition there is a complete list of inductees and their citations.

Citation:  Songs noted in citations for inductees to the Filk Hall of Fame were used as part of the empirical database for this academic article

Outreach
The FilKONtario Concom (convention organizing committee) has twice produced the filk track at a Worldcon:  At Torcon 3, 2003, Toronto, ON and at Anticipation, 2009, Montreal PQ.

In preparation for Anticipation, two of the concom developed a multi-media presentation called "From the Earth to the Moon:  a celebration of manned space flight".  This presentation included PowerPoint, live narration and live music, with many members of the concom and filkers who were present at the con.  It was the keynote filk track item for Anticipation.

Since then the concom has staged "From the Earth to the Moon", four more times:  FilKONtario 2010, a meeting of the USS Hudson Bay (a local science fiction fan club) June, 2010; SFContario, November, 2010; and ConFusion, January, 2011.  The latter three were by specific invitation of the organizing group.

In addition a similar performance focusing on both manned and unmanned space exploration was performed at the invitation of the University of Toronto's Astronomy and Space Exploration Society presentation on 26 September 2009 as an opening act for keynote speaker Dr. David Charbonneau.

Previous conventions

From the FilKONtario program book archive.

References

Sources
 Access to the print archives of FilKONtario—program books, progress reports, etc. 1991 to 2011.
 Tatum, Identity and Authenticity in the Filk Community, 3 Journal of Transformative Works and Cultures (2009). This article discusses what filk is, references the Filk Hall of Fame administered by FilKONtario, and contains excerpts from Sally Childs-Helton's speech at FilKONtario in 2003.
Solomon H. Davidoff, "Filk:" A Study of Shared Musical Traditions and Related Phenomena among Fan Groups (M.A. thesis, Bowling Green State University, 1996). Bowling Green State University Thesis 6673. (At BGSU, call no. LD 4191 O6 No 6673.)

External links
 FilKONtario Home Page
 Interfilk
 Filk FAQ
 Filk Hall of Fame
 Filk Culture

Filk music
Music festivals in Ontario
Science fiction conventions in Canada
Recurring events established in 1991
1991 establishments in Ontario